Katherine Barbeau is a professor at Scripps Institution of Oceanography known for her work on trace metals and the linkages between trace metals and biology.

Education and career 
Barbeau graduated from Mercy High School in Middleton, Connecticut. She has a B.S. from Southampton College (1991), and then moved to the Université libre de Bruxelles for one year. She earned a Ph.D. from the Massachusetts Institute of Technology and Woods Hole Oceanographic Institution in 1998. Following her Ph.D. she was a postdoctoral researcher at the University of California, Santa Barbara until 2001 when she joined the faculty at Scripps Institution of Oceanography.

Research 
Barbeau is known for her work on trace metals, and how marine microorganisms interact with trace metals. Her early work examined how protozoan grazers relieve iron limitation in phytoplankton. Through this research, Barbeau developed new analytical methods, which she applied in the field. Her subsequent research has examined photochemical interactions with metal compounds and iron limitation in the California Current. Her research has also investigated copper levels in the Pacific Ocean, organic compounds that bind to metals in estuaries, and the mechanisms used by bacteria to incorporate metals such as iron into the cell

Selected publications

Awards and honors 
 NASA new investigator (2002)
 Scripps Institution of Oceanography excellence in teaching (2012)

References 

Living people
Southampton College alumni
Massachusetts Institute of Technology alumni
Scripps Institution of Oceanography faculty
Women oceanographers
Women chemists
Year of birth missing (living people)